The Gásadalur Tunnel, Gásadalstunnilin, is a 1.4 kilometre long, single-lane tunnel in the west of the Faroe Islands, on the island of Vágar. It connects the villages of Bøur in the east with Gásadalur in the west, which are separated by the Knúkarnir mountain.

The tunnel was initially open to pedestrians in 2003 but it was not until 2006 that it was officially open and available to vehicles.

See also
 List of tunnels of the Faroe Islands

References 

Tunnels in the Faroe Islands
Tunnels completed in 2006
Road tunnels